Sporobolus rigens is a species of grass in the family Poaceae.

It is native to Argentina.

References

rigens